Omnidirectional (360-degree cameras) can capture spherical 360°180° panoramic photos or videos.

See also
Panorama
Omnidirectional camera

References

Cameras